Donkmeer (meer is 'lake' in Dutch) is a lake in Belgium. It is situated in East Flanders in the municipality of Berlare. There are boats and waterbikes for hire. At the north end a fountain is in the lake.

References

Lakes of Flanders
Landforms of East Flanders
Berlare